Denis Yuryevich Zhukovskiy (born 19 July 1980) is a former Russian professional football player.

Club career
A product of FC Yelets' youth system, Zhukovskiy began his professional career playing for the club in the Russian Second Division before joining local rivals FC Metallurg Lipetsk where he played in the Russian Football National League and Russian Second Division.

Honours
 Russian Second Division Zone Center top scorer: 2007 (17 goals).

References

External links
 

1980 births
People from Yelets
Living people
Russian footballers
Association football forwards
FC Metallurg Lipetsk players
FC Salyut Belgorod players
FC Fakel Voronezh players
FC Sokol Saratov players
Sportspeople from Lipetsk Oblast